The Norwegian First Division, also called 1. divisjon, is the second highest division in women's football in Norway. It was founded in 1984. Between 1984 and 1995 it served as the first tier. 1. divisjon was replaced as a first tier by the Eliteserien which in turn was replaced by the Toppserien in 2000. It continued as a second tier from 1996 and onwards.

First tier
Between 1977 and 1983 women's league football in Norway was organized on a county and regional basis. In 1984, three of these leagues, those representing  Østlandet, Vestlandet and Trøndelag, merged to form the first national league. However, during the earliest seasons teams continued to play in three regional groups, each with ten teams, and the national title was decided by a play-off between the three group winners.  In 1986, a fourth group representing Nord-Norge was added, and the number of teams in the league increased to forty. The league system was subsequently reorganized for the 1987 season. At the end of the 1986 season, thirty of the teams were relegated and formed into a 2. divisjon. The remaining ten teams formed a single nationwide 1. divisjon. The new 1. divisjon remained the top tier of Norwegian women's football until 1995.

List of champions (1984–1995)

Second tier  
With the establishment of the Eliteserien in 1996 the 1. divisjon became a second tier division. At the same time the original 2. divisjon formed in 1987 became the third tier. The 1. divisjon now featured 58 teams in six regional groups. For the 2001 season the 1. divisjon was greatly reduced in size and it once again became single nationwide division. It initially featured nine teams, gradually adding a tenth before expanding to twelve for the 2009 season. All nineteen counties of Norway have been represented in the nationwide 1. divisjon since 2001; Østfold was the last county to be represented, when Sarpsborg 08 got promoted in 2010.

Regional format

Single Division Format

References

External links
1. divisjon at Fotball.no

 
2
Second level women's association football leagues in Europe
Sports leagues established in 1984
1984 establishments in Norway
Professional sports leagues in Norway